Haplogroup J-M304, also known as J, is a human Y-chromosome DNA haplogroup. It is believed to have evolved in Western Asia. The clade spread from there during the Neolithic, primarily into North Africa, the Horn of Africa, the Socotra Archipelago, the Caucasus, Europe, Western Asia, Central Asia, South Asia, and Southeast Asia.

Haplogroup J-M304 is divided into two main subclades (branches), J-M267 and J-M172.

Origins

Haplogroup J-M304 is believed to have split from the haplogroup I-M170 roughly 43,000 years ago in Western Asia, as both lineages are haplogroup IJ subclades. Haplogroup IJ and haplogroup K derive from haplogroup IJK, and only at this level of classification does haplogroup IJK join with Haplogroup G-M201 and Haplogroup H as immediate descendants of Haplogroup F-M89. J-M304 (Transcaucasian origin) is defined by the M304 genetic marker, or the equivalent 12f2.1 marker. The main current subgroups J-M267 (Armenia highlands origin) and J-M172 (Zagros mountains origin), which now comprise between them almost all of the haplogroup's descendant lineages, are both believed to have arisen very early, at least 10,000 years ago. Nonetheless, Y-chromosomes F-M89* and IJ-M429* were reported to have been observed in the Iranian plateau (Grugni et al. 2012).

On the other hand, it would seem to be that different episodes of populace movement had impacted southeast Europe, as well as the role of the Balkans as a long-standing corridor to Europe from the Near East is shown by the phylogenetic unification of Hgs I and J by the basal M429 mutation. This proof of common ancestry suggests that ancestral Hgs IJ-M429* probably would have entered Europe through the Balkan track sometime before the LGM. They then subsequently split into Hg J and Hg I in Middle East and Europe in a typical disjunctive phylogeographic pattern. Such a geographic hall  is prone to have encountered extra consequent gene streams, including the horticultural settlers. Moreover, the unification of haplogroups IJK creates evolutionary distance from F–H delegates, as well as supporting the inference that both IJ-M429 and KT-M9 arose closer to the Middle East than Central or East Asia.

Haplogroup J has also been found among two ancient Egyptian mummies excavated at the Abusir el-Meleq archaeological site in Middle Egypt, which date from a period between the late New Kingdom and the Roman era.

Distribution
Haplogroup J-M304 is found in its greatest concentration in the Arabian peninsula. Outside of this region, haplogroup J-M304 has a significant presence in other parts of the Middle East as well as in North Africa, the Horn of Africa, and Caucasus. It also has a moderate occurrence in Southern Europe, especially in central and southern Italy, Malta, Greece and Albania. The J-M410 subclade is mostly distributed in Anatolia, Greece and southern Italy. Additionally, J-M304 is observed in Central Asia and South Asia, particularly in the form of its subclade J-M172. J-12f2 and J-P19 are also found among the Herero (8%).

Subclade distribution

J-M304*
Paragroup J-M304* includes all of J-M304 except for J-M267, J-M172 and their subclades. J-M304* is rarely found outside of the island of Socotra, belonging to Yemen, where it is extremely frequent at 71.4%. Haplogroup J-M304* also has been found with lower frequency in Oman , Ashkenazi Jews, Saudi Arabia , Greece , the Czech Republic ( and ), Uygurs and several Turkic peoples. ( and ).

YFull and FTDNA have however failed to find J* people anywhere in the world although there are 2 J2-Y130506 persons and 1 J1 person from Soqotra.

The following gives a summary of most of the studies which specifically tested for J-M267 and J-M172, showing its distribution in Europe, North Africa, the Middle East and Central Asia.

J-M267

Haplogroup J-M267 defined by the M267 SNP is in modern times most frequent in the Arabian Peninsula: Yemen (up to 76%), Saudi (up to 64%) , Qatar (58%), and Dagestan (up to 56%). J-M267 is generally frequent among Arab Bedouins (62%), Ashkenazi Jews (20%) , Algeria (up to 35%) , Iraq (28%) , Tunisia (up to 31%), Syria (up to 30%), Egypt (up to 20%) , and the Sinai Peninsula. To some extent, the frequency of Haplogroup J-M267 collapses at the borders of Arabic/Semitic-speaking territories with mainly non-Arabic/Semitic speaking territories, such as Turkey (9%), Iran (5%), Sunni Indian Muslims (2.3%) and Northern Indian Shia (11%). Some figures above tend to be the larger ones obtained in some studies, while the smaller figures obtained in other studies are omitted. It is also highly frequent among Jews, Lemba especially the Kohanim line (46%) .

ISOGG states that J-M267 originated in the Middle East. It is found in parts of the Near East, Anatolia and North Africa, with a much sparser distribution in the southern Mediterranean flank of Europe, and in Ethiopia.

But not all studies agree on the point of origin. The Levant has been proposed but a 2010 study concluded that the haplogroup had a more northern origin, possibly Anatolia.

The origin of the J-P58 subclade is likely in the more northerly populations and then spreads southward into the Arabian Peninsula. The high Y-STR variance of J-P58 in ethnic groups in Turkey, as well as northern regions in Syria and Iraq, supports the inference of an origin of J-P58 in nearby eastern Anatolia. Moreover, the network analysis of J-P58 haplotypes shows that some of the populations with low diversity, such as Bedouins from Israel, Qatar, Sudan and the United Arab Emirates, are tightly clustered near high-frequency haplotypes. This suggests that founder effects with star burst expansion into the Arabian Desert .

J-M172

Haplogroup J-M172 is found in the highest concentrations in the Caucasus and the Fertile Crescent/Iraq and is found throughout the Mediterranean (including the Italian, Balkan, Anatolian and Iberian peninsulas and North Africa) .

The highest ever reported concentration of J-M172 was 72% in Northeastern Georgia . Other high reports include Ingush 32% , Cypriots 30-37% (Capelli 2005), Lebanese 30% (Wells et al. 2001), Assyrian, Mandean and Arab Iraqis 29.7% (Sanchez et al. 2005), Syrians and Syriacs 22.5%, Kurds 24%-28%, Pashtuns Lemba 20-30%,Iranians 23% , Ashkenazi Jews 24%, Palestinian Arabs 16.8%-25%, Sephardic Jews 29% and North Indian Shia Muslim 18%, Chechens 26%, Balkars 24%, Yaghnobis 32%, Armenians 21-24%, and Azerbaijanis 24%-48%.

In South Asia, J2-M172 was found to be significantly higher among Dravidian castes at 19% than among Indo-European castes at 11%. J2-M172 and J-M410 is found 21% among Dravidian middle castes, followed by upper castes, 18.6%, and lower castes 14%.  Subclades of M172 such as M67 and M92 were not found in either Indian or Pakistani samples which also might hint at a partial common origin.

According to a genetic study in China by Shou et al., J2-M172 is found with high frequency among Uygurs (17/50 = 34%) and Uzbeks (7/23 = 30.4%), moderate frequency among Pamiris (5/31 = 16.1%), and also found J-M172 in Han Chinese (10%) and low frequency among Yugurs (2/32 = 6.3%) and Monguors (1/50 = 2.0%). The authors also found J-M304(xJ2-M172) with low frequency among the Russians (1/19 = 5.3%), Uzbeks (1/23 = 4.3%), Sibe people (1/32 = 3.1%), Dongxiangs (1/35 = 2.9%), and Kazakhs (1/41 = 2.4%) in Northwest China. Only far northwestern ethnic minorities had haplogroup J in Xinjiang, China. Uzbeks in the sample had 30.4%  J2-M172 and Tajiks of Xinjiang and Uyghurs also had it.

Phylogenetics
In Y-chromosome phylogenetics, subclades are the branches of haplogroups. These subclades are also defined by single nucleotide polymorphisms (SNPs) or unique event polymorphisms (UEPs).

Phylogenetic history

Prior to 2002, there were in academic literature at least seven naming systems for the Y-Chromosome Phylogenetic tree. This led to considerable confusion. In 2002, the major research groups came together and formed the Y-Chromosome Consortium (YCC). They published a joint paper that created a single new tree that all agreed to use. Later, a group of citizen scientists with an interest in population genetics and genetic genealogy formed a working group to create an amateur tree aiming at being above all timely. The table below brings together all of these works at the point of the landmark 2002 YCC Tree. This allows a researcher reviewing older published literature to quickly move between nomenclatures.

Research publications
The following research teams per their publications were represented in the creation of the YCC tree.

Phylogenetic trees
There are several confirmed and proposed phylogenetic trees available for haplogroup J-M304. The scientifically accepted one is the Y-Chromosome Consortium (YCC) one published in Karafet 2008 and subsequently updated. A draft tree that shows emerging science is provided by Thomas Krahn at the Genomic Research Center in Houston, Texas. The International Society of Genetic Genealogy (ISOGG) also provides an amateur tree.

The Genomic Research Center draft tree
This is Thomas Krahn at the Genomic Research Center's Draft tree Proposed Tree for haplogroup J-P209 . For brevity, only the first three levels of subclades are shown.

J-M304 12f2a, 12f2.1, M304, P209, L60, L134
M267, L255, L321, L765, L814, L827, L1030
M62
M365.1
L136, L572, L620
M390
P56
P58, L815, L828
L256
Z1828, Z1829, Z1832, Z1833, Z1834, Z1836, Z1839, Z1840, Z1841, Z1843, Z1844
Z1842
L972
M172, L228
M410, L152, L212, L505, L532, L559
M289
L26, L27, L927
L581
M12, M102, M221, M314, L282
M205
M241

The Y-Chromosome Consortium tree

This is the official scientific tree produced by the Y-Chromosome Consortium (YCC). The last major update was in 2008 . Subsequent updates have been quarterly and biannual. The current (2022) version is of the 2019/2020 update.

Prominent members of J 

 Ben Affleck
 Qajar dynasty
 Ottoman dynasty
 Khabib Nurmagomedov
 House of Saud
 Rothschild family
 Dustin Hoffman
 Bernard Montgomery
 John Stamos
 Bernie Sanders
 Francesco Petrarca
 Dzhokhar Dudayev
 Adam Sandler

See also

Genetics

Y-DNA J subclades

References

Works cited

Journals

Thesis and Dissertations

Blogs

Mailing Lists

Sources for conversion tables

Further reading
yJdb: the Y-haplogroup J database haplotypes of haplogroup J.

Haplogroup J subclades at International Society of Genetic Genealogy
Nebel et al. 2001, see Modal Haplotypes of "J1" (as Eu10)

Phylogenetic notes

External links

Phylogenetic tree and Distribution Maps of Y-DNA haplogroup J
Y-DNA Haplogroup J and Its Subclades from ISOGG 2009

Others
Youtube Haplogroup J2 Channel
Spread of Haplogroup J, from National Geographic
British Isles DNA Project

J